Timothy Emeka Iroegbunam (born 30 June 2003) is an English footballer who plays as a midfielder for Championship club Queens Park Rangers, on loan from  club Aston Villa. He is a product of the West Bromwich Albion and Aston Villa academies.

Career

Youth career
Iroegbunam played youth football in Sutton Coldfield for Sutton United - where at under-8s level, he played alongside future West Brom and Aston Villa teammate Louie Barry. Iroegbunam started his career at West Bromwich Albion, appearing once on the bench for a Premier League game against Leeds United on 23 May 2021.

On 29 July 2021, Iroegbunam signed for Aston Villa in an undisclosed deal, joining their under-23 academy side.

Senior career
On 5 December 2021, Iroegbunam appeared on the senior bench for Aston Villa, in a 2–1 Premier League victory over Leicester City. After featuring on the bench several more times, Iroegbunam made his Premier League debut on 26 February 2022, as a late substitute for Philippe Coutinho in a 2–0 away victory over Brighton & Hove Albion. On 18 March 2022, Iroegbunam signed a contract extension, running until 2027. On 30 April 2022, Irogebunam was given his first Premier League start for Aston Villa, in a 2–0 victory over Norwich City playing 73 minutes before being substituted for Douglas Luiz.

On 1 September 2022, Iroegbunam signed for Championship club Queens Park Rangers on a season-long loan deal. He made his EFL debut on 3 September, in a 1–0 defeat to Swansea City.

On 25 February 2023, Iroegbunam scored his first goal in senior football, QPR's only goal in a 3–1 defeat to Blackburn Rovers.

International career
On 18 March 2022, Iroegbunam was given his first international call-up when he was named in the England under-20 team for the upcoming matches against Poland and Germany. In the same international break, Iroegbunam was included in the England U19 team and made his international debut on 23 March 2022, in a 3–1 UEFA European Under-19 Championship qualification win over Republic of Ireland.

On 17 June 2022, Iroegbunam was named in the England squad for the 2022 UEFA European Under-19 Championship finals. Iroegbunam featured heavily in the tournament, coming off the bench on 1 July 2022 to play in England's 3–1 extra time victory over Israel in the final.

On 21 September 2022, Iroegbunam made his England U20 debut as a substitute during a 3–0 victory over Chile at the Pinatar Arena.

Personal life
Born in England, Iroegbunam is of Nigerian descent.

Career statistics

Honours 
England U19s

 UEFA European Under-19 Championship: 2022

References

External links
Profile at the Aston Villa F.C. website

2003 births
Living people
People from Great Barr
Footballers from Birmingham, West Midlands
English footballers
English sportspeople of Nigerian descent
Association football midfielders
Aston Villa F.C. players
West Bromwich Albion F.C. players
Premier League players
Black British sportspeople
England youth international footballers
Queens Park Rangers F.C. players
English Football League players